The vice-chancellor of Austria is a member of the Government of Austria and is the deputy to the Chancellor. It is functionally equivalent to a deputy prime minister in other countries with parliamentary systems.

Description of the office
Art. 69(2) of the Constitution of Austria states:

The Vice-Chancellor stands in for the Federal Chancellor in his complete field of functions. If both Federal Chancellor and Vice Chancellor are hindered, the Federal President appoints a member of the government to represent the Federal Chancellor.

In practice, the Vice-Chancellor is normally the leading member of the junior party within the current coalition government, frequently the party chairman. If only one party is represented in the government, the Vice Chancellor is often the Chancellor's presumed successor.

List of officeholders (1919–present)

Vice-Chancellors of Austria during the Interwar period

Austria was annexed by Nazi Germany in 1938 (see Austria under National Socialism for details). Independence was restored in 1945.

Vice-Chancellors of Austria after the end of World War II

See also
Chancellor of Austria

References

Austria, Vice-Chancellors